William D. Reilich (born March 17, 1957) is an American politician best known for having served as a New York State Assemblyman. He serves as Supervisor of the Town of Greece. Most recently re-elected in a landslide receiving over 67% of the vote. This is Reilich's 13th election.

Reilich is a businessman who founded Upstate Alarm systems, Upstate Patrol, Upstate Telecommunications answering service and Corporate Limo company in 1975 at age 18 which he eventually sold before entering politics full time.  He now owns Rochester Auto Design.

Early Career
Reilich began his political career by serving on the Greece, New York zoning and environment boards, eventually becoming the GOP chair for the Town of Greece.  In the early 1990s, he considered running for the Monroe County, New York legislature, but his campaign failed to materialize when redistricting required by the 1990 census left him without a seat for which to run.  In 1997 he was picked by the Republican members of the county legislature, to succeed John T. Auberger who resigned to become Greece town supervisor.

While in the legislature, Reilich served on the Planning and Economic Development Committee and rose to become the chairman of the Ways and Means Committee.  He also served on the board of the County of Monroe Industrial Development Agency (COMIDA).

Reilich successfully defended his county legislative seat in 1999 and ran unopposed in 2001.

New York State Assembly
He was elected to the New York State Assembly in 2002 and served six terms.

In July 2008 He was elected to Chairman of the Monroe County GOP and served for eleven years, the second longest Chair in County history. During that time he also was elected to Vice Chair of the New York State GOP. As Monroe County Chair he was regarded as the most successful chair presiding over 1,000 races with a 93.5% win record in a county that has a Democrat enrolment advantage. At one point had 19 county legislative seats out of 29, and held 3 of the four County wide elected offices.

Greece Town Supervisor
In November 2013,  Reilich was elected to serve as the Supervisor for the Town of Greece.

In Town of Greece v. Galloway, the United States Supreme Court ruled in favor of the practice of opening town meetings with a prayer—a practice Reilich continued from his predecessor.

In 2019, the International Joint Commission (IJC) announced that it had appointed Reilich to the International Lake Ontario-St. Lawrence River Board.

References

External links

1957 births
Living people
Republican Party members of the New York State Assembly
People from Greece, New York
21st-century American politicians